De (Д д; italics: Д д) is a letter of the Cyrillic script. De is usually romanised using the Latin letter D.

History
The Cyrillic letter De was derived from the Greek letter Delta (Δ δ).

In the Cyrillic numeral system, De had a value of 4.

Form
The major graphic difference between De and its modern Greek equivalent lies in the two descenders ("feet") below the lower corners of the Cyrillic letter. The descenders were borrowed from a Byzantine uncial shape of uppercase Delta.

De, like the Cyrillic letter El, has two typographical variants: an older variant where its top is pointed (like Delta), and a modern one (first used in mid-19th-century fonts) where it is square. Nowadays, almost all books and magazines are printed with fonts with the second variant of the letter; the first one is rather stylish and only a few popular text fonts use it (the best known example is "Baltika" designed in 1951-52 by V. G. Chiminova and others).

In italic (Russian) type, the lowercase form looks more like the lowercase Latin , or a partial derivative symbol . Southern (Serbian, Bulgarian, Macedonian) typography may prefer a variant that looks like a single-storey lowercase Latin . Cursive lowercase De has the same two shapes, but with a different distribution: for example, the g-shaped variant is a standard for Russian schools.

The (Russian-Ukrainian-Belarusian-Bulgarian) cursive form of capital De looks like Latin D as the printed version is not comfortable enough to be written quickly. The Serbian cursive form is closer to the shape of a numeral "2" (identical to the form sometimes used for uppercase cursive Latin Q); this form is unknown in Russia.

Usage
It most often represents the voiced dental plosive . However, word-finally and before voiceless consonants, it represents a voiceless . Before a palatalizing vowel, it represents .

Related letters and other similar characters
Δ δ : Greek letter Delta
D d : Latin letter D
Л л : Cyrillic letter El
Ԁ ԁ : Cyrillic letter Komi De
G g : Latin letter G
 ∂  : Partial derivative symbol

Computing codes

References

External links